Steve Edmonds, nicknamed "Rock", is an Australian former rugby league footballer who played in the 1970s and 1980s.  He played for Cronulla-Sutherland in the New South Wales Rugby League (NSWRL) competition.

Playing career
Edmonds made his first grade debut for Cronulla in 1972.  In 1973, Edmonds played in 3 of Cronulla's finals games as the club reached their first grand final.  Edmonds cruelly missed out on selection in the match as he was ruled out with an injury.  Cronulla went on to lose the grand final 10-7.

In 1978,  Cronulla finished 2nd on the table and qualified for the finals.  Cronulla defeated Manly in the opening week of the finals series 17-12.  Cronulla then defeated minor premiers Western Suburbs to reach their second grand final against Manly.

In the Grand Final, Edmonds played on the wing as Cronulla went to a 9-4 lead in the second half as Edmonds scored a try in the corner before Manly came back to hit the front 11-9. A Steve Rogers penalty squared it at 11-all but he then missed a desperate late field-goal attempt and at full-time the scores remained locked in front of 51,000 fans.  Just 3 days later, Cronulla and Manly were required to contest a grand final replay to declare a winner as the Australian team had been announced the same week and were heading to England.  Both Manly and Cronulla went into the replay with tired players but it was Manly who prevailed in the replay 16-0 winning their fourth premiership in front of a low crowd of 33,552.

In 1979, Edmonds finished as top try scorer for Cronulla with 13 tries.  Edmonds retired at the end of the 1981 season and at the time was one of the club's longest serving players.

Post playing
Edmonds was nominated in the Cronulla "Team of the Half Century" acknowledging the club's best players from 1967 to 2016.

References

Cronulla-Sutherland Sharks players
Rugby league wingers
1954 births
Living people